Vampirina is a computer-animated children's television series created by Chris Nee. Based on the Vampirina Ballerina series of books written by Anne Marie Pace and published by Disney-Hyperion, the series was announced in March 2016 and premiered on Disney Junior and Disney Channel on October 1, 2017. It features much of the staff that has worked on another program created by Nee, Doc McStuffins.

The series ended on June 28, 2021, after 3 seasons and 75 episodes.

Premise
Vampirina follows the story of Vampirina "Vee" Hauntley who becomes the new kid on the block after she and her family move from Transylvania to Pennsylvania to open a local bed and breakfast called the Scare B&B for visiting ghouls (including vampires) and goblins. The Hauntley family have to learn to do things the "Pennsylvania way," especially when Vee is at school, all while keeping their monster lives a secret from humans so they don't scare them.

Characters

Main
 Vampirina "Vee" Hauntley (voiced by Isabella Crovetti)  is a physically 8-year-old vampire, but biologically near 200 years old as stated in "Countess Vee". Unlike in the books, in the TV adaptation she and her family have blue skin and super-speed. She is the lead singer and spookylele player of her band, the Ghoul Girls.
 Oxana and Boris Hauntley (voiced by Lauren Graham and James Van Der Beek) are Vee's parents who are the proprietors of the Scare B&B.
 Demi Hauntley (voiced by Mitchell Whitfield) is a blue ghost who lives with the Hauntleys. He is Vee and Gregoria's sidekick.
 Gregoria (voiced by Wanda Sykes) is a 473-year-old gargoyle who is Vee's sidekick.
 Poppy Peepleson (voiced by Jordan Alexa Davis) is Edgar's sister and Edna's daughter who is Vee's best friend. She is the first human who discovers Vee's true identity, but promises not to tell anyone. She's the drummer and the youngest of the Ghoul Girls. She is 8-years-old. In "Double Double Halloween Trouble", she and her family are revealed to be Hispanic. Her first name is probably chosen as a reference to Gothic author Billy Martin's pen name Poppy Z. Brite (cf. her brother's first name being that of Edgar Allan Poe).
 Bridget (voiced by ViviAnn Yee) is a very shy and nervous girl who is another one of Vee's friends. She also soon discovers Vee's identity, and like Poppy, promises to keep it secret. She has a pet Sphynx cat named Miss Cuddlecakes. She's the bassist and the smartest of the Ghoul Girls. She is also 9-years-old. She is revealed to be partly Jewish in "Double Double Halloween Trouble".
 Edgar Peepleson (voiced by Benji Risley) is Poppy's brother and Edna's son who is Vee's friend. He is a monster enthusiast and runs a vlog called "Weekly Weirdness". In the Season 2 finale episode "Ghoul Guides Save the Day!", he finally learns Vee's secret of her family being vampires, and the fact that monsters are actually real when he visits Vee's home town, Transylvania for the first time. However, just like Poppy and Bridget, he promises not to tell anyone. He is the percussionist and twin member of the Ghoul Girls. He is 8-years-old. Similarly to his sister, Edgar's first name is probably chosen as a reference to a Gothic author - namely Edgar Allan Poe.

Supporting
 Wolfie Hauntley (voiced by Dee Bradley Baker) is a purple dog who is the Hauntley's house pet. He can assume a werewolf-like form during a full moon or by drinking milk.
 Penelope is a plant monster who is the Hauntley's house pet.
 Chef Remy Bones (voiced by Ian James Corlett) is a skeleton who is the head chef of the Scare B&B. He speaks with a French accent.
 Edna Peepleson (voiced by Cree Summer) is Poppy and Edgar's mom.

Recurring
 Nanpire and Grandpop (voiced by Patti LuPone and Brian Stokes Mitchell) are Vee's grandparents.
 Mr. Gore (voiced by Dee Bradley Baker) is Vee's human school teacher.

Guests
 Cosmina and Narccissa (voiced by Alex Ellis and Laraine Newman respectively) are two 800-year old internet-using vampire sisters who were guests at the Scare B&B.
 King Pepi (voiced by Andrew Rannells) is a mummy from Egypt. 
 Nosferatu "Nosy" (voiced by Kari Wahlgren) is Olga’s baby daughter and Vampirina's baby cousin.
 Aunt Olga (voiced by Kari Wahlgren) is Vampirina's aunt, Nosy’s mother, Oxana’s sister and Boris’ sister-in-law.
 Matilda (voiced by Lara Jill Miller) is a cuddly Snugglot monster. 
 Mr. Froufington (voiced by Phil LaMarr) is a foodie who visits the Scare B&B to try Oxana's food.
 Phoebe (voiced by Sanai Victoria) is a little witch who first appears in "The Little Witch".
 The Scream Girls are Vee's favorite goulish rock band.
 FrankenStacey (voiced by Kaley Snider)
 Creepy Caroline (voiced by Raini Rodriguez)
 Ghastly Gayle (voiced by Gabriela Milo)
 Buttons (voiced by Nika Futterman) is a blue Cuddle Monster.
 Hornadette and Shriekia (voiced by Georgie Kidder and Debi Derryberry respectively) are a two-headed monster whose two heads are sisters.
 Rusty Topsail (voiced by Christian Borle) is a ghost pirate.
 Bob Bigfoot (voiced by Ethan Suplee) is an old friend of Boris who is often called "Uncle Bob" by Vee.
 Poltergeist Pat (voiced by Adam DeVine) is an arrogant entertainer who cheats in order to win a talent show.
 Frankenstein (voiced by Skylar Astin) is an old friend of Boris who tends to forget things.
 Bride of Frankenstein (voiced by Anna Camp) is the girlfriend of Frankenstein who gets engaged to him.

Episodes

Broadcast
Vampirina premiered on Sunday, October 1, 2017 in the United States with two back-to-back episodes simulcast on Disney Channel and Disney Junior. Of the first season's 15 episodes, 10 premiered within the month of October to tie into Halloween and were also placed on Disney Junior's streaming and video on demand venues. In Canada, the show premiered on Disney Junior on October 7, 2017. In January 2018, a second season was announced by Disney, which premiered on December 7, 2018. A third season was announced on September 7, 2018, which premiered on October 5, 2020. Vampirina is broadcast in 115 countries and translated into 15 languages. The series concluded with its series finale in June 2021 after 75 episodes.

Home media

Awards and nominations

References

External links
 

2010s American animated television series
2020s American animated television series
2017 American television series debuts
2021 American television series endings
2017 Irish television series debuts
2021 Irish television series endings
2010s American horror comedy television series
2020s American horror comedy television series
2010s American comic science fiction television series
2020s American comic science fiction television series
American children's animated comic science fiction television series
American children's animated science fantasy television series
American children's animated horror television series
American children's animated musical television series
Irish children's animated science fantasy television series
American computer-animated television series
American preschool education television series
Animated preschool education television series
Irish preschool education television series
2010s preschool education television series
2020s preschool education television series
Disney Junior original programming
Disney animated television series
Television series by Brown Bag Films
Television series by Disney
Television shows set in Pennsylvania
Vampires in animated television
Works about immigration to the United States
American children's animated supernatural television series
English-language television shows
American television shows based on children's books
Television series about vampires